Melanie Wilson is an American actress.

Career 
Wilson is best known for her co-starring role as Jennifer Lyons-Appleton in the ABC sitcom Perfect Strangers. Her other television credits include Family Matters, Step by Step, Simon & Simon and The A-Team. She did a week of The $100,000 Pyramid in 1988.

In 2009, she appeared in the Lifetime Television network film Prayers for Bobby.

Personal life 
She is the daughter of actor Dick Wilson, the former commercial spokesman ("Mr. Whipple") for Charmin toilet paper.

Filmography

Film

Television

References

External links

20th-century American actresses
21st-century American actresses
American film actresses
American television actresses
Living people
Place of birth missing (living people)
Year of birth missing (living people)